Leptobrachella serasanae (sometimes known as the Serasan Borneo frog) is a species of amphibian in the family Megophryidae.
It is found in Pulau Serasan (the type locality; South Natuna, Indonesia) and central Sarawak, Borneo, (Malaysia).
Its natural habitats are tropical moist lowland forests and rivers.
It is threatened by habitat loss.

References

serasanae
Amphibians of Indonesia
Amphibians of Malaysia
Amphibians of Borneo
Amphibians described in 1983
Taxonomy articles created by Polbot